Bernard Vallée (5 October 1945 – 2 April 2021) was a French sabre fencer. He competed at the 1968 and 1972 Summer Olympics.

References

External links
 

1945 births
2021 deaths
French male sabre fencers
Olympic fencers of France
Fencers at the 1968 Summer Olympics
Fencers at the 1972 Summer Olympics
Sportspeople from Aubervilliers
Fencers from Paris
Universiade medalists in fencing
Universiade gold medalists for France
Medalists at the 1967 Summer Universiade